WCZZ is a daytime-only urban adult contemporary radio station located in Greenwood, South Carolina (Lakelands area). The station is licensed by the Federal Communications Commission (FCC) to broadcast on 1090 AM and 102.7 FM with an effective radiated power (ERP) of 5,000 watts daytime  and 2,250 watts critical hours on the 1090 AM and 24 hours on the FM dial at 102.7 FM.

History
1090 AM originally signed on in 1973 as WMTY with 1,000 watts of power. Throughout its run, it has carried mostly satellite formats, originally oldies as "Cruisin' Oldies 1090", and the calls were eventually changed to the current WCZZ. In 2006, the station became "Rejoice! 1090" carrying ABC Radio's Rejoice! Musical Soul Food satellite format. The station switched to sports talk via ESPN Radio in 2007. In June 2009, that station changed to an urban gospel format.

In 2017, the WCZZ switched formats to sports talk, branded as "Fox Sports Greenwood". The station remains on the AM dial at 1090 and has added an FM translator frequency at 102.7 FM.

On November 13, 2020, WCZZ changed their format from sports to urban adult contemporary, branded as "Magic 102.7".

References

External links

CZZ
Radio stations established in 1973
1973 establishments in South Carolina
CZZ
Urban adult contemporary radio stations in the United States